Barry David Keim (born September 9, 1963, in New Orleans, Louisiana) is the Richard J. Russell Professor in the Department of Geography & Anthropology at Louisiana State University (LSU), as well as the state climatologist for the state of Louisiana. He was previously on the faculty of the University of New Hampshire, and was the New Hampshire state climatologist, from 1994 to 2003. He is known for researching extreme weather, such as hurricanes and heavy rainfall.

References

External links
Faculty page

People from Chalmette, Louisiana
1963 births
Living people
Louisiana State University faculty
American climatologists
University of New Orleans alumni
Louisiana State University alumni